New Palace, Kolhapur is a palace situated in Kolhapur, in the Indian state of Maharashtra. The Palace took 7 years to complete, from 1877 to 1884, costing about seven lakhs of rupees. Being an excellent specimen of Indian architecture built in black polished stone, it has been an attraction for tourists. It has extensive premises with a garden, fountain and wrestling ground. The whole building is eight-angled and has a tower in the middle. The clock on it was fixed in 1877. At separate distances there are small towers. On every glass are painted the events in Chhatrapati Shivaji Maharaj's life, the founder of Maratha Empire. There is a zoo and a ground lake. Even today, it is the residence of Chhatrapati Shahu Maharaja, the direct descendant of Chhatrapati Shivaji Maharaja.

Mant's masterpiece at Kolhapur, however, is the New Palace, 1.5 km further north on Bhausingji Road. Completed in the same year as the Hospital, this complex presents a novel blend of disparate features in contrasting basalt and sandstone. The principal south facade presents a double-storeyed range, with Neo-Mughal lobed arches beneath and temple-like columns and brackets above. This scheme is interrupted by trefoil arches capped with curving cornices and small domes. The same elements cap the octagonal corner towers.

The ground floor of the New Palace accommodates the Shahaji Chhatrapati Museum, given over to memorabilia of the Kolhapur rulers. Several tourists from across the country visit the New Palace each year. This museum exhibits royal ways of existence.

It is dedicated to a fine collection of possessions of Chhatrapatis of Kolhapur like costumes, weapons, games, jewellery, embroidery and paraphernalia such as silver elephant saddles. A letter from the British Viceroy and Governor General of India is the other memorabilia. There is also one of Aurangzeb's swords at the Shahaji Chhatrapati Museum. One section has stuffed Tigers, Tiger heads, Wild Dog, Sloth Bear, staring Wild Buffalo, Lion, Black Panther, Wild Boar, Black Buck, a number of other Deer varieties, and a Himalayan Black Bear.

The Darbar Hall occupies a double-height space in middle of the Palace. The side walls display lobed arches filled with stained glass illustrating scenes from the life of Chhatrapati Shivaji Maharaj ; carved columns with temple-like brackets support the cast iron balcony above. A raised throne is placed at one end of the Hall. Photos include one of the Maharajah with his hundredth dead tiger, elephant hunts and a series detailing how to train a cheetah.

See also
Maratha Empire
Kolhapur State
Sambhaji Raje

References 

Museums in Maharashtra
Kolhapur
Palaces in Maharashtra
Decorative arts museums in India
Buildings and structures of the Maratha Empire
Tourist attractions in Kolhapur district
Buildings and structures in Kolhapur
Royal residences in India
Buildings and structures completed in 1884
1884 establishments in India